Broń Radom is a Polish professional football club based in Radom, Poland.

The history of the organization dates back to 1926, when workers of FB "Łucznik" Radom formed the Club of Cyclists and Motorcyclists Broń (Polish word broń means weapon in English, as FB Łucznik, main sponsor of the club, is a manufacturer of firearms). In the course of time, other departments were added, and the organization changed name into Sports Club Broń. With financial support of the Łucznik plant, Broń emerged as the largest sports organization in the city of Radom. By the early 1930s, Broń had such departments, as archery, tennis, boxing, volleyball, cycling and football. Construction of a new stadium and a swimming pool was initiated, and a cycling track was built.

The organization continued to prosper after World War Two. In the 1960 Olympic Games in Rome, Broń's own Kazimierz Pazdzior won gold medal in lightweight boxing. Broń's cyclist Andrzej Michalak qualified to the 1980 Olympic Games, also its tennis players were recognized nationwide.

In the late 1970s and early 1980s, Broń's football team played in the second tier of Polish football system. Among most famous players who began their careers there were Kazimierz Przybys, Tomasz Dziubinski (two caps for Poland), and Rafal Siadaczka (17 caps for Poland).

In 1996, several departments became independent, and football team was renamed into Radom Football Club 1926 Broń Radom.

Sources
 History of Broń Radom (in Polish). Retrieved December 3, 2015

External links
Broń Radom official website (Polish)
Broń Radom at the Fans website (Polish)
Broń Radom at the 90minut.pl website (Polish)

 
Football clubs in Radom
Association football clubs established in 1926
1926 establishments in Poland